The Tonsfeldt Round Barn is a historic building located on the Plymouth County Fairgrounds in LeMars, Iowa, United States.  It was built in 1918 to house H.P. Tonsfeldt's purebread Polled Hereford cattle, and prize bull, on his farm west of the city. The building is a true round barn that measures . The barn features white horizontal siding, an aerator and a Gothic curved roof. The self-supporting Gothic-arch dome of this barn is a unique feature on Iowa's round barns. In 1981 the barn was moved from the farm to the fairgrounds in order to preserve it. It is now used for exhibit space. The barn has been listed on the National Register of Historic Places since 1986.

References

Gothic-arch barns
Infrastructure completed in 1918
Buildings and structures in Plymouth County, Iowa
National Register of Historic Places in Plymouth County, Iowa
Barns on the National Register of Historic Places in Iowa
Round barns in Iowa
Le Mars, Iowa
Relocated buildings and structures in Iowa